Lolliguncula is a genus of squid from the family Loliginidae from the eastern Pacific and western Atlantic, known as brief squid. The genus is divided into two subgenera Lolliguncula and Loliolopsis. They are rather small squids with a maximum mantle length of 120mm, that inhabit shallow warm seas, although some species have been recorded in areas of low salinity. They are typified by having a short mantle, which is round at the posterior; and fins that are broader than long, but which have no posterior lobes. The males produce spermatophores with a long cement body and they lack a ventral crest on their hectocotylus. Their suckers have square teeth which ring the entire margin or are placed distally. The males do not have enlarged suckers on the left ventral arm. The tentacular club is expanded and contains suckers in four series. The two subgenera differ in the morphology of the hectocotylus.

Species
The following species are classified under Lolliguncula:

Subgenus Lolliguncula (Loliolopsis) Berry, 1929
Lolliguncula diomedeae (Hoyle, 1904) dart squid
Subgenus Lolliguncula (Lolliguncula) Steenstrup, 1881
Lolliguncula argus Brakoniecki & Roper, 1985 Argus brief squid or Argus thumbstall squid
Lolliguncula brevis (Blainville, 1823) Atlantic brief squid or Atlantic thumbstall squid
Lolliguncula panamensis Berry, 1911 Panama brief squid or Panama thumbstall squid

References

Cephalopod genera
Squid